Elophila responsalis is a moth in the family Crambidae. It was described by Francis Walker in 1866. It is found in Australia, where it has been recorded from Queensland.

The wingspan is about 20 mm. There is a pattern of brown, white and yellow on the wings.

References

Acentropinae
Moths described in 1866
Moths of Australia